Afshan Ahmed (born 22 September 1966) is a Pakistani singer who is known for her television and radio songs like, "Dosti Aisa Naata", "Meray Bachpan Ke Din", and others.

Early life  
Afshan's family migrated to Pakistan from India in 1965. Her mother Asma Ahmed was a singer at All India Radio.  In the 1970s, Asma did playback singing in films and was paired with singer Akhlaq Ahmed. Afshan started singing in a children's television program "Hamari Shaam" at a young age. She then joined musician Sohail Rana's shows for children Kaliyon Ki Mala and Hum Sooraj Chand Sitaray. She was appreciated for singing a song, "Dosti Aisa Naata".

Career 
Later, she sang many songs for Pakistan Television during the 1980s and 1990s, including the popular wedding song, "Babula Way Lay Jayn Na Loag Mujk Ko". She also appeared in a Binaca toothpaste commercial.

Afshan performed at Children's literature Festival in 2016 and she sang Gaao mere Sung, Jeevey, Jeevey Pakistan, Yeh Des Hamara Hai and children's favourite song of yesteryear, Dosti Aisa Naata Jo Sone Se Bhi Mehnga.

She was a panel judge at Obhartay Sitaray Competition in 2018 which was held by The Citizens Foundation (TCF).

In 2019 on July 23rd she performed at the EMI event which was held in honor of classical musicians and singers, especially in memory of Nisar Bazmi the event was organized by singer Tanveer Afridi and the director of Public Relations of EMI Pakistan.

In 2019 on November 28th she performed at Pakistan Mega Fashion Film and Art Award Show which was at Flatties Hotel and was organized by Israr Hussain.

In 2022 on November 15th she participated at Endowment Fund Trust for Preservation of the Heritage of Sindh to restore cultural heritage.

Television shows

Popular songs 
 Dosti Aisa Naata --- Music: Sohail Rana
 Meray Bachpan kay Din --- Co-singer: Mohammed Ali Shehki
 Babula Way Lay Jaayen Na Loag Mujh Ko --- Music:  Niaz Ahmed
 Dil Teri Haveli Hay --- Co-singer: Akhlaq Ahmed
 Bojhal Bojhal Palkon Par --- Co-singer: Alamgir
 Door Kahin Jheelon Se Koi --- Music: Alamgir

References

External links 
 

1966 births
20th-century Pakistani women singers
Singers from Lahore
Punjabi-language singers
Pakistani women singers
Pakistani radio personalities
Urdu-language singers
21st-century Pakistani women singers
Radio personalities from Lahore
Women ghazal singers
Pakistani ghazal singers
Living people